June 22 - Eastern Orthodox Church calendar - June 24

All fixed commemorations below celebrated on July 6 by Orthodox Churches on the Old Calendar.

For June 23rd, Orthodox Churches on the Old Calendar commemorate the Saints listed on June 10.

Saints
 Martyr Agrippina of Rome and her companions Paula, Bassa, and Agathonica (253-259)
 Hieromartyrs Aristocleus the Priest, Demetrian the Deacon, and Athanasius the Reader, at Salamis on Cyprus (302 or 306)  (see also: June 20)
 Martyrs Eustochius, Gaius, Proba, Lollia, and Urban, of Ancyra (4th century)
 Venerable Hesychios the Sinaite, hegumen of Saint Catherine's Monastery (7th century)
 Venerable Barbaros the Myrrhgusher, "the Pentapolitis" (c. 820-829)  (see also: May 15 )

Pre-Schism Western saints
 Saint Felix of Sutri, a priest of Sutri in Lazio in Italy, scourged to death under Valerian and Gallienus (257)
 Saint John, a priest in Rome, beheaded under Julian the Apostate (362)
 Saint Moeliai (Moelray), born in Ireland and baptised by St Patrick, he became Abbot of Nendrum Monastery (c. 493)
 Venerable Etheldreda (Audrey, Etheldred, Æthelthryth), Queen and Abbess, foundress of Ely Monastery, England (679)  (see also: October 17 - Translation of Relics )
 Saint Hidulf, Count of Hainault in Belgium, he became a monk at Lobbes Abbey which he had helped to found, Benedictine abbot (c. 707)
 Saint Jacob of Toul, Bishop of Toul (769)
 Saint Walhere, a priest in Belgium murdered for his righteousness and venerated as a martyr.

Post-Schism Orthodox saints
 Saint Nicetas of Thebes in Boetia, and his disciples Theodore, Gregory, and Daniel (1079)
 Saint Dionysius of Polotsk (1182)
 Saint Artemius of Verkola (1545)
 Venerables Joseph, founder (1612), Anthony, and Ioannicius, Abbots of Zaonikiev Monastery, Vologda (17th century)

New martyrs and confessors
 New Hieromartyr Kallinikos of Veroia (1821)
 New Hieromartyrs and martyrs of Crete (1821): 
 Gerasimos of Crete; 
 Neophytos of Knossos; 
 Ioakeim of Hersonissos; 
 Hierotheos of Lambis; 
 Zacharias of Sitia; 
 Ioakeim of Petra; 
 Gerasimos of Rethymnos; 
 Kallinikos of Kydonia;
 Melchisedek of Kissamos;
 Kallinikos of Diapolis;
 and those with them, clerics and laymen, in 1821 and 1822.
 New Hieromartyrs Alexander Miropolsky, Alexis Vvedensky, and Peter Smorodintsev, Priests (1918)
 New Hieromartyr Mitrophan (Krasnopolsky), Archbishop of Astrakhan (1919)
 New Hieromartyr Leontius (von Vimpfen), Bishop of Enotaeva, and those with him (1919)
 New Hieromartyr Maxim (Zhizhilenko), Bishop of Serpukhov (1931)

Other commemorations
 Synaxis of the Saints of Vladimir (1982)
 Meeting of the Vladimir Icon of the Most Holy Theotokos (1480)  (see also: May 21 )
 Icons of the Most Holy Theotokos:
 "Umileniye" ("Of Tender Feeling") of the Pskov-Caves Monastery (1524); 
 "Zaonikiev" (1588) 
 "Vratarnitsa"(1894) 
 Translation of the relics of Venerable Michael of Klopsk, Fool-for-Christ of Klopsk Monastery, Novgorod (1482)
 Second translation of the relics (1714) of St. Herman, Archbishop of Kazan (1567)
 Repose of Schemamonk Zosimas of Solovki (1855) 
 Repose of Ivan M. Kontzevitch, spiritual writer (1965)

Icon gallery

Notes

References

Sources
 June 23/July 6. Orthodox Calendar (PRAVOSLAVIE.RU).
 July 6 / June 23. HOLY TRINITY RUSSIAN ORTHODOX CHURCH (A parish of the Patriarchate of Moscow).
 June 23. OCA - The Lives of the Saints.
 The Autonomous Orthodox Metropolia of Western Europe and the Americas (ROCOR). St. Hilarion Calendar of Saints for the year of our Lord 2004. St. Hilarion Press (Austin, TX). p. 46.
 The Twenty-Third Day of the Month of June. Orthodoxy in China.
 June 23. Latin Saints of the Orthodox Patriarchate of Rome.
 The Roman Martyrology. Transl. by the Archbishop of Baltimore. Last Edition, According to the Copy Printed at Rome in 1914. Revised Edition, with the Imprimatur of His Eminence Cardinal Gibbons. Baltimore: John Murphy Company, 1916. pp. 182–183.
 Rev. Richard Stanton. A Menology of England and Wales, or, Brief Memorials of the Ancient British and English Saints Arranged According to the Calendar, Together with the Martyrs of the 16th and 17th Centuries. London: Burns & Oates, 1892. pp. 285–287.
Greek Sources
 Great Synaxaristes:  23 ΙΟΥΝΙΟΥ. ΜΕΓΑΣ ΣΥΝΑΞΑΡΙΣΤΗΣ.
  Συναξαριστής. 23 Ιουνίου. ECCLESIA.GR. (H ΕΚΚΛΗΣΙΑ ΤΗΣ ΕΛΛΑΔΟΣ). 
  23 Ιουνίου. Αποστολική Διακονία της Εκκλησίας της Ελλάδος (Apostoliki Diakonia of the Church of Greece).
  23/06/2018. Ορθόδοξος Συναξαριστής. 
Russian Sources
  6 июля (23 июня). Православная Энциклопедия под редакцией Патриарха Московского и всея Руси Кирилла (электронная версия). (Orthodox Encyclopedia - Pravenc.ru).
  23 июня по старому стилю / 6 июля по новому стилю. Русская Православная Церковь - Православный церковный календарь на 2017 год.
  23 июня (ст.ст.) 6 июля 2014 (нов. ст.). Русская Православная Церковь Отдел внешних церковных связей. (DECR).

June in the Eastern Orthodox calendar